Baby I'm Yours may refer to:
 "Baby I'm Yours" (Barbara Lewis song), 1965
 "Baby I'm Yours" (Steve Wariner song), 1988
 "Baby I'm Yours," a song from Breakbot's 2012 album By Your Side
 "Baby I'm Yours," a song by the Arctic Monkeys, released 2006
 "Baby I'm Yours", a song on the 1992 Shai album ...If I Ever Fall in Love
 Baby I'm Yours (EP), a 2007 EP by Math and Physics Club
 Baby I'm Yours (album), a 1992 album by Maureen McGovern